The Marquesas butterflyfish (Chaetodon declivis) is a species of marine ray-finned fish, a butterflyfish belonging to the family Chaetodontidae. It is found in the central Pacific Ocean.

Description
The Marquesas butterflyfish is an attractive species with a silvery-white body marked with black spots and having the upper posterior part of the body with a blackish wedge shaped area. There is also a yellow vertical band running through the eye. The dorsal fin is yellowish-orange while the caudal fin is yellow.

Distribution
The Marquesas butterflyfish is restricted to the Central Pacific Ocean, where it is confined to the Line Islands in the United States Minor Outlying Islands, Phoenix Islands in French Polynesia and Kiribati and Marquesas in French Polynesia.

Habitat and biology
The Marquesas butterflyfish occurs over rocky and sandy bottoms and is an oviparous species which forms pairs for breeding. In the wild this omnivorous species feeds on coral polyps, fanworms, crustaceans, tunicates and algae.

Taxonomy and etymology
The Marquesas butterflyfish was first formally described in 1975 by the American ichthyologist John Ernest Randall with the type locality given as Hanauu Bay on Fatu Hiva in the Marquesas Islands. The specific name  declivis is Latin for sloping and refers to the diagonally sloping dark patch on the upper posterior part of the body and fins. Populations of similar fishes to C. declivis in the Marshall Islands are thought to be hybrids between this species and the Burgess' butterflyfish (C. burgessi).

Utilisation
The Marquesas butterflyfish was formerly caught in numbers for the aquarium trade but this has declined since 2006.

References

Chaetodon
Taxa named by John Ernest Randall
Fish described in 1975